José María Calderón (2 March 1830 - 18 October 1870) was a Bolivian military officer and adventurer. Eccentric and erratic, Calderón flourished under the dictatorship of Mariano Melgarejo. He was known for his brutal and ferocious, even cruel, demeanour.

Early life 
He was born in a convent at the small town of San Pedro de Atacama to Eulalia Calderón. His mother was only a teenager at the time and his father was suspected to be a Russian adventurer. He never met his mother as she moved to either Chile or Peru when he was a child. Calderón was raised at the convent, being the only institution in the remote town where he could be housed.

Calderón was a mischievous child and escaped the convent on several occasions. When he was ten years old, he completely left San Pedro and headed to Potosí. There he would be housed by the Ugalde family but eventually escaped three years later. He eventually found himself in La Paz, where he decided to join the army, aged only fourteen.

In the Bolivian Army 
His time as a soldier was also troublesome and he was expelled from the army at sixteen years of age. Angered with his country, Calderón decided to leave and head to Europe. It is not clear how he got to Europe nor how he afforded such a venture. However, it is widely believed that he was a stowaway on a Portuguese merchant ship which had departed Cobija in March 1847. This ship was headed to trade along the western coast of Africa and finally arrived in Lisbon in December 1847. In Lisbon he conned a captain that he was an aristocrat back in his homeland. The captain, completely fooled, agreed to take him to Genoa for free. While this is the most accepted version of the events, nothing has ever been concrete.

Adventures in Europe 
Italy (1848-1850)

He landed in Italy in February 1848 after a journey that lasted nearly a year. Calderón claimed to have lived through several adventures in that year, but he never mentions them. Finally in Europe, Calderón did not hesitate to join in the chaos that rocked the continent that year. Only a month after his arrival, he participated in the uprising of Milan against the Austrian garrison on March 18, 1848. The uprising succeeded but Milan was soon besieged by Marshal Joseph Radetzky, who failed to retake the city due to desertions and the widespread support in the region for the revolt.

Having read books about the Roman Empire while he lived in Potosí, he was fascinated by the city of Rome and wanted to continue his adventure there. In November 1848, Rome had gone through a liberal revolution and the Pope Pius IX was forced to flee. Calderón was in Rome during the riots and the chaos. With the pope gone, a Roman Republic was proclaimed on February 9, 1849. Calderón hopes to lend his services to the new republic but was incarcerated after allegedly murdering the owner of a tavern in southern Rome. He spent the following year imprisoned under the name “Giovanni Caldorone”.

In 1850, Calderón managed to escape his jailers and headed to Paris. Before he was able to enter the city, gypsies assaulted him somewhere in the outskirts of Paris. But before they killed him, he befriended the group who allowed him to tag along. He discovered they were Spanish gypsies and communicated with them easily as such. For the following three years he roamed Europe with his ragtag band of gypsies, purportedly robbing people everywhere they went. In his three years in the camp, he sired several children with multiple women. The mother of one of his children hoped to marry him. But Calderón was unwilling and, when threatened by her father, he escaped in the dead of night and headed toward Russia.

Russia (1853-1855)

Calderón had heard and read about the great feats of Tsar Alexander I, the man who had outsmarted Napoleon. Unaware of who ruled  Russia and believing that the Tsar was still alive, he took a lengthy journey to Saint Petersburg. He arrived via sea route from Calais on September 19, 1853. When he discovered that the Tsar was long dead, he regretted his journey. However, an opportunity arrived only months later when the Crimean War broke out. Calderón enlisted in the volunteer legion and is said to have fought valiantly. Having caught dysentery in June 1854, Calderón nearly died and only recovered a year later. He was able to participate in the siege of Kars in 1855, but was taken captive by the Ottomans.

The prisoner camp Calderón was in barely had any guards. Because of this he was able to slit a guard's throat and steal his garments. He stole a horse and fled the prisoner camp. Unaware of where he was and unable to communicate with anyone, he decided to go West in hopes of making it back to Europe.

Spain and Mexico (1860-1864)

Calderón disappears from history at this point and reappears in Málaga in June 1858. He travelled to Madrid in November of that year and enlisted in the Spanish Army. Having become engaged to a Spanish woman, whom he had a child with previously, Calderón decided to leave Spain. A few months later, in May 1860, he embarked on a ship which took him to Veracruz, Mexico. He arrived in December of that year. Coincidentally, Mexico found itself consumed by chaos and anarchy. He arrived on the eve of the Second French Intervention in Mexico and, once the conflict had begun, he would take up arms alongside the conservatives.

Serving under the army of general Forey, he participated in countless battles and skirmishes, including the occupation of Mexico City by the French army. But in 1864, Calderón murdered his superior, Captain Juan de Dios Mírales. Although he claimed it was out of self defence, several others were aware of Calderón's blood thirsty and vengeful nature. Aware of the hostility toward him, Calderón fled Mexico.

Return to Bolivia 
On May 11, 1864, Calderón found himself back in his native Bolivia. He had arrived via sea transport from El Salvador to Cobija. Upon his arrival, Bolivia found itself engulfed by chaos and anarchy. The president at the time, José María de Achá, was barely holding onto power. Sensing an opportunity, Calderón joined General Mariano Melgarejo in his efforts to oust the unpopular Achá. By the end of that year, Achá was ousted by Melgarejo. After assassinating Manuel Isidoro Belzu in 1865, Melgarejo cemented his power and kept Calderón in his retinue. The infamous caudillo and Calderón had an intriguing relationship to say the least. Both were similar in personality and cruelty as well as lechery. Melgarejo, grateful for Calderón's help in ousting Achá and ever fascinated by his adventurous stories, made him a general in the army. This caused a scandal, since Calderón was an adventurer and not a soldier.

Fall from grace and death 
Calderón fell out of favour with Melgarejo in 1869. Although the details aren't clear, General Téllez writes that it was because Calderón had courted Juana Sánchez, Melgarejo's mistress. Deprived of his rank, Calderón barely escaped the ire of the brutish caudillo.

He established himself in Lima in October 1869. There, he met Japanese pirates and convinced them to take him to Japan. There, he had plans to masquerade himself as the President of Bolivia. He sailed from Lima on August 1 of that year. After months of sailing and two stops in the Philippines, Calderón approached Shibushi Bay where he had agreed to land with the captain of the ship. On October 18, 1870, his ship made it to the bay and, when authorities threatened to shoot, he declared in Japanese, “I am the president of the Republic of Bolivia. I demand an audience with your Emperor.” Without hesitation, the guards opened fire and killed him. His body was tossed overboard.

References 

Bolivian military personnel
1830s births
1870s deaths